Taxahaw is an unincorporated community in Lancaster County, South Carolina, United States.

The "great syenite dyke" extends from Hanging Rock, South Carolina through Taxahaw to the Brewer and Edgeworth mine in Chesterfield.

References

Unincorporated communities in Lancaster County, South Carolina
Unincorporated communities in South Carolina